Ravna Gora is a highland in central Serbia, at the mountain of Suvobor. It is renowned as the birthplace of the modern Chetnik movement under the leadership of Dragoljub Mihailović in 1941.

Ravna Gora was the site of a celebration marking the 50th anniversary of VE Day in 1995. Among others, the celebration was attended by Major Richard Felman of the United States Air Force, one of more than 400 US airmen rescued by the Chetniks during World War II. According to statistics compiled by the US Air Force Air Crew Rescue Unit, between 1 January and 15 October 1944, a total of 1,152 American airmen were airlifted from Yugoslavia, 795 with the assistance of the Yugoslav Partisans and 356 with the help of the Serbian Chetniks.

Geographical regions of Serbia
Geography of Šumadija and Western Serbia
Hills of Serbia

sh:Ravna Gora